Frederick W. Gibson (born 1907) was an English professional footballer who played as a goalkeeper.

Career
Born in Somercotes, Gibson played for Dinnington Main, Frickley Colliery, Hull City, Middlesbrough, Bradford City and Boston United. In the 1929–1930 season he replaced the injured George Maddison in the Hull City goal, helping Hull to a semi-final replay in the FA Cup, losing narrowly to eventual winners, Arsenal. For Hull City he made over 100 Football League and FA Cup appearances, plus many more in the Midland League. For Middlesbrough he made over 100 appearances, including in the First Division. For Bradford City he made 10 appearances in the Football League.

Sources

References

External links
Official Frickley Athletic museum and hall of fame website

1907 births
Year of death missing
English footballers
Frickley Athletic F.C. players
Hull City A.F.C. players
Middlesbrough F.C. players
Bradford City A.F.C. players
Boston United F.C. players
English Football League players
Association football goalkeepers
People from Somercotes
Footballers from Derbyshire